Grass cloth (China grass cloth) is an umbrella term for many handloom cloths made with yarns from several vegetable fibers such as hemp, ramie, nettle fiber, flax, etc. Grass cloth has its origin in East Asia. The cloth is more associated with the cottage industry in China.

It is also known as '' Canton linen and Japanese grass cloth''

Weave 
Grass cloth is a loose weave structure with a plain weave.

Texture 
Grass cloth has a soft texture and fine enough to compare with French cambric. China grass cloth made with Chines ma, a species of canabbis hemp, is very lightweight and appears like linen.

Use 
Grass cloth used for various usages such as tablecloths, sportswear, and blouses.

See also 

 Linen

References 

Woven fabrics
East Asian traditions